The Bröhn (405 m), is the highest hill in the Deister range in the German state of Lower Saxony.

Height 
At 405.0 metres above sea level (NN), the Bröhn is:

 the highest hill in the Deister,
 the highest hill on the extreme northern rim of the German Central Uplands,

because all hills in Germany with a higher latitude are lower than the Bröhn.

Observation tower 
On the summit of the Bröhn stands the Anna Tower (Annaturm), a  microwave tower made of reinforced concrete, the 5th successor to the original survey tower that was built on this spot at the instigation of Professor Carl Friedrich Gauss in 1834. From this observation tower there is a panoramic view in good weather over the Calenberg Land as far as Hildesheim and Hanover, to Lake Steinhude and also over the northern Weser Uplands.

Next to the Anna Tower is the woodland inn of the same name, the building in the foreground of the picture. The Anna Tower is about 3 kilometres from the car park on the Nienstedt Pass. It is also about 3 kilometres from Springe (car park towards Köllnischfeld). The Anna Tower is open daily except Mondays (10.00 – 17.00).

Not far from the Bröhn, on the Höfeler (395 m), is a tower belonging to German Air Traffic Control with a  radar site. Each of these six sites across the country has a capture radius of about 145 nautical miles, or about 270 km. In the vicinity on the crest of the Deister are other flight safety installations.

In the 1950s there was an air traffic control centre of the Federal Agency for Air Safety. At 11 am on a September day in 1958 an F-84 Thunderjet fighter of the Danish Air Force crashed about 300 metres east of the control centre. The aeroplane grazed several treetops over a distance of some 500 metres before exploding. Its 24-year-old pilot, Jörgensen, died in the crash. He had taken off with his squadron from Copenhagen and his destination was the Upjever air base near Schortens. In fog, he lost his bearings and sent his last position report at a height of 250 m over Stadthagen.

References 

Hills of Lower Saxony
Deister